Pakala Venkataramana Rao Rajamannar (1901–1979) was an Indian judge and politician who served as the acting Governor of Madras State from 1957 to 1958.  P.V. Rajamannar was the first Indian to become Chief Justice of Madras High Court after independence from 1948 to 1961. He was also the first Chairman of Sangeet Natak Akademi in New Delhi.

Early life
P. V. Rajamannar was born to Dewan Bahadur P. Venkataramana Rao, an eminent lawyer who was a Madras High Court Judge and later Chief Justice of Mysore High Court. He completed his schooling at Pachaiyappa's High School, Madras and did his graduation in the Presidency College, securing First Class in English and Philosophy in B.A in 1921. In B.L he won the Jurisprudence prize in 1923.

Career in law
In 1924, Rajamannar started his law practice joining his father's chambers. In 1944 P.V. Rajamannar was appointed Advocate-General in succession to Sir Alladi Krishnaswami Aiyar. His appointment also made Rajamannar one of the youngest Advocate-Generals at 43 years of age. He also appeared as the Public Prosecutor in one of the most sensational murder cases in South India, Lakshmikanthan murder case involving two popular actors and a journalist with criminal history.

Chief Justice
Later in 1945, P. V. Rajamannar was appointed Judge of Madras High Court and in 1948 Rajamannar became the first Indian to be elevated as Chief Justice of Madras High Court. He retired in 1961 and continued his active services for government by heading various committees.

Other services

Finance Commission
During the years 1966-1969 P. V. Rajamannar was also the Chairman of The Fourth Finance Commission of India.

In addition Rajamannar was also the Chairman for the Fourth Law Commission and the Banking Laws Committee.

Educational Boards
P.V. Rajamannar was also the Chairman of Board of Studies of Law and Chaired the Board of Studies in Telugu at Sri Venkateswara University and Theater Art Faculty at Andhra University. He was also the Member of Syndicate of Madras University.

State Autonomy Committee
In 1969, P.V. Rajamannar was appointed the Chairman of a 3-member committee P.V. Rajamannar committee to study the State Autonomy and Centre-State relations by the then newly elected DMK government under its Chief Minister Dr. M. Karunanidhi.

Arts and literature
In addition to his career in Law and administration P. V. Rajamannar was active in Arts and was the first appointed chairman of Sangeet Natak Akademi in New Delhi. During his college years and later he edited a Telugu literary journal called Kala and winning the Ramarayaninger Prize for a Telugu work Representative Government in Ancient India. In 1964, he was awarded the Sangeet Natak Akademi Fellowship the highest honour conferred by Sangeet Natak Akademi, India's National Academy for Music, Dance and Drama.

Honours and legacy
P. V. Rajamannar was conferred Honorary Doctorates from Madras University, Andhra University and Annamalai University. Justice P V Rajamannar Salai (Road) in K. K. Nagar, Chennai is named in his honour. He was also nominated twice to Upper House in Madras and on two occasions acted as governor.

Works and publications
 India: Republic Day 1956  (1956) – English -  (Co-Author John Haynes Holmes, K. M. Panikkar, P. V. Rajamannar and N. C. Mehta) 
 Aesthetic experience, (Sir George Stanley endowment lectures) (1960) - English
 Rajamannaru natikalu: Ayidu ekanka natikalu (1968) – Telugu
 Report on negotiable instruments law, 1975  (1976) - English
 Report on indigenous negotiable instruments (hundis), 1978 (1979) - English
 Report on personal property security law, 1977  (1978) - English
 First report of the Study Group Reviewing Legislation Affecting Banking: banking legislation (1971) - English
 Tamil Nadu Report, 1971 by P. V. Tamil Nadu Rajamannar (1971) - English

References

Sources
First Chairman, Dr P.V. Rajamannar
Metroplus First Indian Chief Justice High Court of Madras
 Article by DR. P. V. RAJAMANNAR on MODERNITY Vs. TRADITION IN INDIAN ART
Telegraph article on States autonomy Committee
Interstate Council's Rajamannar Committee
Financial Commissions

Governors of Tamil Nadu
1901 births
1979 deaths
Chief Justices of the Madras High Court
20th-century Indian judges
Madras Christian College alumni
Recipients of the Sangeet Natak Akademi Fellowship
Presidency College, Chennai alumni
Advocates General for Tamil Nadu
20th-century Indian lawyers
Telugu people